Jürgen Fassbender was the defending champion, but lost in the first round this year.

Guillermo Vilas won the title, defeating Karl Meiler 2–6, 6–0, 6–2, 6–3 in the final.

Seeds

  Guillermo Vilas (champion)
  Ilie Năstase (semifinals)
  Jan Kodeš (quarterfinals)
  Jürgen Fassbender (first round)
  Karl Meiler (final)
  Dick Crealy (first round)
  Nikola Pilić (first round)
  Hans-Jürgen Pohmann (quarterfinals)

Draw

Finals

Section 1

Section 2

External links
 1974 Bavarian Tennis Championships Singles draw

Singles